Velus Tyler Phillip Jones Jr. (born May 11, 1997) is an American football wide receiver and return specialist for the Chicago Bears of the National Football League (NFL). He played college football at USC before transferring to Tennessee.

Early life and high school
Jones was born in Mobile, Alabama and lived there until his family moved to Saraland, Alabama when he was eight years old. He attended Saraland High School and was named first team All-State as a junior after catching 51 passes for 1,118 yards and nine touchdowns. Jones repeated as a first team All-State selection as a senior. Jones was rated a four-star recruit and committed to play college football at USC. He later de-committed and then briefly committed to play at Oklahoma before re-committing to play at USC.

College career
Jones began his college career at USC and redshirted his true freshman season. He served as the Trojans' primary kick returner in his redshirt freshman season and gained 760 yards on 31 returns. As a redshirt sophomore, Jones caught 24 passes for 266 yards with one touchdown, returned 21 kickoffs for 483 yards, and also rushed for a touchdown. He returned 29 kickoffs for 704 yards and one touchdown during his redshirt junior season and was named to the second team All-Pac-12 Conference. After the season, Jones announced his intention to transfer from USC and ultimately committed to play at Tennessee.

Jones joined the Tennessee Volunteers as a graduate transfer, and was eligible to play for the team immediately. In his first season with the team he caught 22 passes for 280 yards and three touchdowns and led the Southeastern Conference (SEC) with 398 kickoff return yards. Jones decided to utilize the extra year of eligibility granted to college athletes who played in the 2020 season due to the coronavirus pandemic and return to Tennessee. He finished the 2021 season with 62 receptions for 807 yards and seven touchdowns and was named the SEC Special Teams Player of the Year after returning 24 kickoffs for 628 yards and one touchdown and 18 punts for 272 yards.

College career statistics

Professional career

Jones was drafted by the Chicago Bears in the third round with the 71st pick of the 2022 NFL Draft. He signed a four-year contract with the Bears on May 17, 2022. Jones did not play in the first three weeks of the 2022 season for the Bears due to a hamstring injury. Jones made his NFL debut in Week 4 against the New York Giants on special teams. With the Bears down 20–12 with 2:14 left in the game, Jones muffed a punt on the Bears' own 34 yard line that was recovered by the Giants. Jones scored his first career touchdown on his first career reception in a 29–22 loss to the Minnesota Vikings during Week 5. In Week 6 against the Washington Commanders on Thursday Night Football, Jones muffed his second punt of the season, which was recovered by the Commanders on the Bears 6-yard line. This led to the Commanders' only touchdown of the game, and Bears would go on to lose 12–7.

References

External links

 Chicago Bears bio
USC Trojans bio
Tennessee Volunteers bio

1997 births
Living people
USC Trojans football players
Tennessee Volunteers football players
Players of American football from Alabama
American football wide receivers
People from Mobile County, Alabama
Chicago Bears players